Richard David (born April 8, 1958) is a Canadian former professional ice hockey left winger. He played for the Quebec Nordiques in the National Hockey League, and the World Hockey Association between 1978 and 1983. As a youth, he played in the 1971 Quebec International Pee-Wee Hockey Tournament with a minor ice hockey team from Buckingham, Quebec.

Career statistics

Regular season and playoffs

References

External links
 

1958 births
Living people
Canadian ice hockey left wingers
Erie Blades players
Fredericton Express players
HC Sierre players
Hull Festivals players
Ice hockey people from Quebec
Lausanne HC players
Montreal Canadiens draft picks
Quebec Nordiques players
Quebec Nordiques (WHA) players
Rochester Americans players
Sorel Éperviers players
Trois-Rivières Draveurs players